Västmanlands-Dala nation, mostly referred to only as V-Dala, is one of the 13 student nations at Uppsala University in Sweden. The nation, intended for students from the provinces of Dalarna and Västmanland – these provinces making up most of the diocese of Västerås – was founded in 1639.  The first inspektor of the nation was Olof Rudbeck the Elder, appointed in 1663. The current  is Peter Wallensteen, professor, Department of Peace and Conflict Research, Uppsala University.

Architecture
The house of Västmanlands-Dala nation is one of three buildings in Sweden designed by the world-famous Finnish architect Alvar Aalto. The house was built in 1965, and was paid for by fund-raising in Dalarna and Västmanland.

Inspektors 
 Västmanlands-Dala nation

External links
 Västmanland-Dala Nation's website

Nations at Uppsala University
Alvar Aalto buildings
Modernist architecture in Sweden
1639 establishments in Sweden
Functionalist architecture
Student organizations established in the 17th century